The Kent County Council election, 2013 was an election to all 84 seats on Kent County Council held on Thursday 2 May as part of the 2013 United Kingdom local elections. 84 councillors were elected from 72 electoral divisions, which returned either one or two county councillors each by first-past-the-post voting for a four-year term of office. The electoral divisions were the same as those used at the previous election in 2009. No elections were held in Medway, which is a unitary authority outside the area covered by the County Council. The election saw the Conservative Party narrowly retain overall control of the council.

All locally registered electors (British, Irish, Commonwealth and European Union citizens) who were aged 18 or over on Thursday 2 May 2013 were entitled to vote in the local elections. Those who were temporarily away from their ordinary address (for example, away working, on holiday, in student accommodation or in hospital) were also entitled to vote in the local elections, although those who had moved abroad and registered as overseas electors cannot vote in the local elections. It is possible to register to vote at more than one address (such as a university student who had a term-time address and lives at home during holidays) at the discretion of the local Electoral Register Office, but it remains an offence to vote more than once in the same local government election.

Summary
The Conservative Party retained overall control of the council, winning 44 of the 84 seats on the council. This was a reduction of 30 seats from the party's 2009 performance, where the local party held all but 10 of the 84 seats.

UKIP came second in terms of councillors with 17 seats (including one defection from the Conservatives prior to the election), the party is now the council's official opposition with Roger Latchford as their leader. UKIP capitalised on their strong national opinion poll performances and Parliamentary by-election results, winning their first representation on the council. Labour Party candidates made substantial gains, rising from 3 to 13 seats and finishing in third place in the election. Despite local Liberal Democrats winning the same number of seats as in 2009 they are no longer the official opposition, having slipped to become the fourth largest party in the Maidstone County Hall chamber.

The Green Party won their first seat on the Council, for the Hythe division.

The Swanscombe and Greenhithe division was held by the incumbent independent councillor, who gained the seat in 2009.

Results

|}

Council Composition
Prior to the election the composition of the council was:

After the election the composition of the council was:

LD - Liberal Democrats
G - Green Party
R - Residents Association

Results by district
Kent is divided into 12 regions: Ashford, Canterbury, Dartford, Dover, Gravesham, Maidstone, Sevenoaks, Folkestone and Hythe, Swale, Thanet, Tonbridge and Malling, and Tunbridge Wells.

Ashford

There are seven single-member constituencies within the borough of Ashford. Below are the results:

Canterbury

There are five single-member and two multi-member constituencies within the City of Canterbury, which elect a total of nine councilors to Kent County Council. Below are the results:

Dartford
There are six single-member constituencies within the borough of Dartford. Below are the results:

Dover

There are three single-member and two multi-member constituencies within the District of Dover, which elect a total of seven councillors to Kent County Council. Below are the results:

Gravesham

There is a single-member and two multi-member constituencies within the Borough of Gravesham, which elect a total of five councillors to Kent County Council. Below are the results:

Maidstone

There are seven single-member and one multi-member constituencies within the Borough of Maidstone, which elect a total of nine councillors to Kent County Council. Below are the results:

Sevenoaks
There are seven single-member constituencies within the District of Sevenoaks which elect to Kent County Council. Below are the results:

Shepway
There are six single-member constituencies within the District of Shepway, that elect councillors to Kent County Council. The results are:

Swale
There are six single-member constituencies and one multi-member constituencies within the Borough of Swale, which elect a total of eight councillors to Kent County Council. Below are the results:

Thanet

There are two single-member and three multi-member constituencies within the District of Thanet, which elect a total of eight councillors to Kent County Council. Below are the results:

Tonbridge and Malling
There are five single-member constituencies and one multi-member constituency within the District of Tonbridge and Malling, which elect a total of seven councillors to Kent County Council. Below are the results:

Tunbridge Wells
There are six single-member constituencies within the Borough of Tunbridge Wells. Below are the results:

References

External links
Kent County Council

2013 English local elections
2013
2010s in Kent